Russula pumicoidea is a fungus in the family, Russulaceae, found on sandy soils in Eucalyptus forests in Western Australia.

It was first described in 2007 by Teresa Lebel and Jennifer Tonkin.

References

pumicoidea
Taxa named by Teresa Lebel
Fungi described in 2007